Paranoid Park can refer to: 

Paranoid Park (novel), a 2006 young adult novel by Blake Nelson
Paranoid Park (film), a 2007 film by Gus Van Sant based on the 2006 novel
O'Bryant Square, a small park in Portland, Oregon whose nicknames include "Paranoid Park"